Greya obscuromaculata is a moth of the family Prodoxidae. In North America it is found in southern British Columbia, Alberta, Washington, Idaho and Montana. The habitat consists of moist coniferous forests.

The wingspan is 13–17 mm. The forewings have a white base color and dark or light brown spots. Adults are sexually dimorphic, with males having isolated darker patches on a solid background, while females have more extensive dark on the forewings. The hindwings are uniformly grey.

The larvae possibly feed on Osmorhiza chilensis and/or Tiarella trifoliata.

References

Moths described in 1921
Prodoxidae